Gerald William "Jerry" Trainor (born January 21, 1977) is an American actor and musician. He is known for playing Spencer Shay in the teen sitcom iCarly, winning three Kids' Choice Awards for his performance, and reprises the role on its revival series of the same name. He also appeared in Drake & Josh as "Crazy" Steve and T.U.F.F. Puppy as Dudley Puppy, for which he received a nomination for a Daytime Emmy Award. Since 2004, Trainor has worked primarily on the Nickelodeon network. Outside of this, he has had recurring and guest roles on young adult-oriented shows on the Disney Channel and Netflix as well as in more mature shows like Crossing Jordan and 2 Broke Girls.

Early life
Trainor was born and raised in San Diego, California, the son of Bill Trainor, a retired Navy fighter pilot and public defender, and Madelyn Trainor, a retired high school calculus teacher. He has an older sister named Liz. He is of Irish descent.

Trainor grew up in the San Diego community of Scripps Ranch and attended the University of San Diego High School. He studied drama at the University of California, Santa Barbara and graduated with a Bachelor of Fine Arts degree. He studied improvisation at The Groundlings school in Los Angeles. Before becoming an actor, he worked at San Diego SeaWorld.

Career

His first television role was in the MTV series Undressed as Eric. Some of his other television credits include Law & Order True Crime, Angel, and Malcolm in the Middle. His first recurring TV role was as Brian "the A.V. guy" on Crossing Jordan. He has had a number of small roles in films such as the science fiction drama Donnie Darko and the cheerleader comedy Bring It On Again. He appeared on the web series Hungry Girl.

Trainor had a recurring role on Drake & Josh as "Crazy" Steve, a movie theater worker, from 2004 to 2007. He starred in iCarly as Spencer Shay, the older brother and guardian of Miranda Cosgrove's title character from 2007 to 2012 (he and Cosgrove had previously acted together on Drake & Josh, as Cosgrove played the role of the title duo's little sister). For iCarly, he won three Kids' Choice Awards. He completed the 2008 music-themed comedy Wreckless Epic, in which he stars. Trainor starred in the animated series T.U.F.F. Puppy as the voice of Dudley Puppy, for which he was nominated for a Daytime Emmy Award for Outstanding Performer in an Animated Program. 

Trainor was involved in a World of Warcraft video series titled Project Lore, playing the Draenei shaman Goggins. He was replaced by Jeff Cannata after leaving the series in February 2009. He also starred alongside iCarly co-star Jennette McCurdy in the Nickelodeon TV movie Best Player, where he played Quincy Johnson, a video-game enthusiast whose main competition in a video-gaming contest is McCurdy's character. 

In 2013, Trainor starred in the short-lived series Wendell & Vinnie as Vinnie, the uncle and guardian of Buddy Handleson's character Wendell. He played Commander Michael Sullivan for both seasons of the Halo in-universe podcast Hunt the Truth. In 2017, Trainor voiced the recurring role of Commander Cone on Bunsen Is a Beast.
 
Since 2018, Trainor and Mike O'Gorman have starred in a comedy Web series called The Porch, which can be found on YouTube. In 2018, Trainor starred in the film Cover Versions written and directed by award-winning filmmaker Todd Berger. The film premiered at the 2018 Palm Springs Film Festival and was acquired for distribution by Sony Pictures. Parts of the film were shot on location during the Kaaboo Del Mar music festival in  San Diego, California. Trainor's performance was heralded as being edgy and thought-provoking.

In March 2021, it was announced that iCarly was being revived. The series premiered on Paramount+ in June of that year, with Trainor reprising his role as Spencer Shay.

Music career
In October 2015, Trainor formed the band Nice Enough People with guitarist-vocalist Mike O'Gorman, drummer Andrew Zuber, and guitarist Allison Scagliotti, who also happened to be a co-star of Trainor's in Drake & Josh as the character Mindy Crenshaw. Trainor plays bass for the group. The group released its first EP, Hanover Hideaway, on June 22, 2016.

Filmography

Film

Television

Video games

Discography
Hanover Hideaway (2016)

Soundtrack appearances

Awards and nominations

References

External links

Jerry Trainor at Nick.com

1977 births
Living people
21st-century American male actors
21st-century American male musicians
American Internet celebrities
American male comedians
American male film actors
American male television actors
American male voice actors
American people of Irish descent
Male actors from California
Male actors from San Diego
Musicians from San Diego
University of California, Santa Barbara alumni
University of San Diego High School alumni